The May Bumps 2014 were a set of rowing races at Cambridge University from Wednesday 11 June 2014 to Saturday 14 June 2014. The event was run as a bumps race and was the 123rd set of races in the series of May Bumps which have been held annually in mid-June in this form since 1887.

Head of the River crews
  rowed over on all four days to retain the headship they won in 2011.

  women bumped  on day 1 to regain the headship.

Highest 2nd VIIIs
  bumped  on the final day to become the highest placed men's second VIII. 

  rose 6 places to finish as the highest placed women's second VIII, 2nd overall in the W2 division.

Links to races in other years

Bumps Charts

Below are the bumps charts for all 6 men's and all 4 women's divisions, with the men's event on the left and women's event on the right. The bumps chart shows the progress of every crew over all four days of the racing. To follow the progress of any particular crew, find the crew's name on the left side of the chart and follow the line to the end-of-the-week finishing position on the right of the chart.

This chart may not be displayed correctly if you are using a large font size on your browser. A simple way to check is to see that the first horizontal bold line, marking the boundary between divisions, lies between positions 17 and 18.

The Getting-on Race

The Getting-on Race allows a number of crews which did not already have a place from last year's races to compete for the right to race this year.

The 2014 May Bumps Getting-on Race took place on 6 June 2014.

Competing crews

Men

15 men's crews raced for 9 available spaces at the bottom of the 5th division, and the top of the 6th division.  The following were successful and rowed in the bumps.

The following were unsuccessful.

Women

20 women's crews raced for 10 available spaces in the 4th division.  The following were successful and rowed in the bumps. The combined Hughes Hall/Lucy Cavendish women's crew is listed as Lucy Cavendish only.

 (Became )

The following were unsuccessful.

References

May Bumps
May Bumps results
May Bumps
May Bumps